Dunlop is a neighbourhood in Baranagar of North 24 Parganas district, in the Indian state of West Bengal. It is under the jurisdiction of Kolkata Metropolitan Development Authority (KMDA) and Barrackpore Police Commissionerate.

Location
The boundary of Dunlop is :- in the east – the Rail line from Sealdah towards Dankuni and Baruipara; in the west – Dakshineswar and Hooghly river; in the north – Kamarhati and Belgharia and in the south – Alambazar, Baranagar Bazar and Bonhooghly. Dakshineswar Kali Temple lies just a quarter of a mile from this place.

Transport

Road

B.T. Road (part of both SH 1 and SH 2) passes through Dunlop. Belghoria Expressway also passes through Dunlop. "Dunlop Crossing" (B.T. Road, Gopal Lal Tagore Road and PWD Road Junction) is one of the largest crossings near Kolkata which connects Kolkata with Northern suburban areas and Howrah, Hooghly.

Shahid Bhagat Singh Flyover (Dunlop Bridge) connects B.T. Road (Saket Nagar) with PWD Road (Ashokgarh). It has easened smooth passing of the light vehicles at Dunlop Crossing. The flyover was opened on 8 October 2012.

Railways

Baranagar Road railway station is situated at Dunlop. It is a Kolkata suburban railway station. It is one of the oldest railway station. Sealdah - Dankuni line's trains pass through this station.

Metro railways
The extension of Kolkata Metro Line 1 from Dum Dum to Dakshineswar was sanctioned in 2010–11. It was extended up to Noapara in 2013. The subsequent work was held up because of the encroachments on railway land. The Baranagar metro station was inaugurated on 22 February 2021 and commercial metro services were started on the following day .

References

External links

 Baranagar Municipality

Cities and towns in North 24 Parganas district
Neighbourhoods in North 24 Parganas district
Neighbourhoods in Kolkata
Kolkata Metropolitan Area
Baranagar